Kentucky Woman is a 1983 American made-for-television drama film, directed by Walter Doniger, starring Cheryl Ladd, Ned Beatty and Peter Weller. Filmed in Paintsville, Kentucky, and at a coal mine in Martin County, Kentucky  at Martin County Coal Corporation (Massey Energy).

Plot summary

Maggie Telford (Cheryl Ladd), a poverty-stricken waitress, faces harassment and humiliation when she goes to work as a coal miner to support her small son and ailing coal miner father disabled with black lung disease (Ned Beatty).

Cast
 Cheryl Ladd as Maggie Telford 
 Ned Beatty as Luke Telford 
 Philip Levien as Ward Elkins 
 Sandy McPeak as Roger Varney 
 Tess Harper as Lorna Whateley 
 Lewis Smith as Spinner Limbaugh 
 Peter Weller as Deke Cullover 
 Peter Hobbs as Doc James Bartholomew 
 Christopher Coffey as Fred Obermeyer 
 Brett Johnson as Andy Telford 
 Britt Leach as Amos 
 John Randolph as Reverend Palkstater 
 Nancy Vawter as Aunt Minnifer 
 James Carrington as Lukash 
 John Chappell as Fred Humphries

References

External links 
 
 
 

1983 television films
1983 films
1983 drama films
Films set in Kentucky
Films shot in Kentucky
CBS network films
20th Century Fox Television films
American drama television films
1980s American films
Paintsville, Kentucky
Massey Energy